Hin Lat is a subdistrict in the Wat Bot District of Phitsanulok Province, Thailand.

Etymology
Hin Lat means 'stone slope' in Thai.

Geography
Hin Lat lies in the Nan Basin, which is part of the Chao Phraya Watershed.

Administration
The subdistrict is divided into nine smaller divisions called (muban), which roughly correspond to the villages within Hin Lat. There are six villages, but portions of Ban Noi occupy three muban. Hin Lat is administered by a Tambon administrative organization (TAO). The muban in Hin Lat are enumerated as follows:

Temples
The following is a list of active Buddhist temples in Hin Lat:
วัดท่าหนอง in Ban Tha Nong
วัดหินลาด in Ban Hin Lat
วัดบ้านน้อย in Ban Noi
วัดใหม่ท่าจรเข้สามัคคี in Ban Noi
วัดท่าจรเข้ in Ban Noi
วัดบ้านโนน in Ban Tha Kon Ben

References

Tambon of Phitsanulok province
Populated places in Phitsanulok province